Ines Heise (born 9 November 1975) is a German former professional tennis player.

Heise qualified for her only WTA Tour main draw at the 1996 Warsaw Cup by Heros. Following qualifying wins over Sylwia Rynarzewska, Kateřina Kroupová and Elena Tatarkova, she was beaten in the first round by Polish player Aleksandra Olsza. She reached her career high singles ranking of 209 in the world in December 1996.

ITF finals

Singles: 1 (0–1)

References

External links
 
 

1975 births
Living people
German female tennis players